Mejiro McQueen (Japanese : メジロマックイーン, April 3, 1987 - April 3, 2006) was a Japanese Thoroughbred racehorse and sire. He was a late-maturing horse who did not emerge as a top-class performer until the autumn of his three-year-old season when he won the Kikuka Sho. Over the next three years he proved himself one of the best stayers in Japan with wins in the Tenno Sho (twice), Takarazuka Kinen, Osaka Hai, Kyōto Daishōten (twice) and Hanshin Daishoten (twice). He won the JRA Award for Best Older Male Horse in 1991 and was inducted into the Japan Racing Association Hall of Fame shortly after his retirement from racing.

Background
Mejiro McQueen was grey horse bred in Japan by Katashi Yoshida. During his racing career he was owned by Mejiro Shouji Co Ltd and trained by Yasuo Ikee

Mejiro McQueen was the best horse sired by Mejiro Titan, who won the Tenno Sho in 1982. His dam Mejiro Aurora showed modest racing ability, winning one minor race from 24 starts but did better as a broodmare and also produced the Kikuka Sho winner Mejiro Durren. She was descended from the British broodmare Astonishment, who was imported to Japan in the first decade of the 20th century.

Racing career 
Mejiro McQueen did not race as a two-year-old but made a successful racecourse debut over 1700 metres on dirt in February 1990 at Hanshin Racecourse. He was beaten in his next three starts before taking two minor races at Hakodate Racecourse in September. On 4 November at Kyoto Racecourse he recorded his first major success in his last run of the year when he took the 3000 metre Kikuka Sho.

On his first appearance as a four-year-old Mejiro McQueen won the Grade 2 Hanshin Daishoten at Chukyo Racecourse, setting a record time of 3:07.3 for the 3000 metre turf course. In April at Kyoto he took his second Grade 1 prize as he won the spring edition of the Tenno Sho over 3200 metres. When dropped in trip for the Takarazuka Kinen over 2200 metres in June he ran well again, but was beaten into second place by Mejiro Ryan. After the customary summer break he returned in October to win the Grade 2 Kyoto Daishoten and then finished first in the autumn Tenno Sho. In the latter race, however, he was disqualified and placed last of the eighteen runners: he had been drawn on the outside and hampered several horses when his jockey tracked over to the inside rail just after the start. He put up good efforts in defeat on his last two starts that year, coming home fourth behind the American horse Golden Pheasant in the Japan Cup and finishing a close second to Dai Yusaku in the Arima Kinen. In the JRA Awards for 1991 he was voted the year's Best Older Male Horse.

Mejiro McQueen's 1992 campaign was restricted to two races, but he won them both. He began by taking the Hanshin Daishoten for the second successive year. On 26 April at Kyoto he followed up his 1991 success by winning the spring Tenno Sho for a second time. Injury problems kept the horse off the track for the rest of the year.

After an absence of more than eleven months Mejiro McQueen returned in April 1993 and won the Grade 2 Osaka Hai at Hanshin in a record time of 2:03.2. His attempt to win an unprecedented third edition of the spring Tenno Sho narrowly failed as he finished second of the fifteen runners behind Rice Shower. On 13 June at Hanshin he won the Takarazuka Kinen at the second attempt to record his fourth Grade 1 success. He returned in October to win a second Kyoto Daishoten in a record time of 2:22.7  in what proved to be his final start.

In 1994 Mejiro McQueen was inducted into the Japan Racing Association Hall of Fame.

Stud record
Mejiro McQueen was retired from racing to become a breeding stallion at Shadai Stallion Station. He has sired the Grade 3 winners Time Fair Lady and Eidai Queen. He performed a valuable service at stud as he formed a close bond with Sunday Silence and acted as a calming influence on the hitherto obstreperous American stallion. Mejiro McQueen's daughters did well as broodmares and he was the damsire of both Orfevre and Gold Ship. He died in 2006 at the age of nineteen.

Pedigree

See also
 List of historical horses

References

1987 racehorse births
2006 racehorse deaths
Racehorses bred in Japan
Racehorses trained in Japan
Thoroughbred family 7-c